Thomas Henry Fraser is an ichthyologist and expert in cardinalfishes.  According to the Australian Museum website, "He is a world expert on the taxonomy of Cardinalfishes." The combtooth blennies Dodekablennos fraseri and Meiacanthus fraseri were named in honour of Fraser.

References

Ichthyologists
Living people
Year of birth missing (living people)